Aleksandar Radev (born 24 June 1960) is a Bulgarian boxer. He competed in the men's bantamweight event at the 1980 Summer Olympics. He lost in his opening fight to John Siryakibbe of Uganda, after the referee stopped the contest.

References

1960 births
Living people
Bulgarian male boxers
Olympic boxers of Bulgaria
Boxers at the 1980 Summer Olympics
Place of birth missing (living people)
Bantamweight boxers